The Polonez is a Belarusian 300 mm rocket artillery system of a launcher unit comprising eight rockets packaged in two four-rocket pods mounted on a MZKT-7930 vehicle. In 2018, it was exported to Azerbaijan. The system was designed by the Belarusian Plant of Precision Electromechanics in cooperation with a foreign country, probably China. The first combat missile launches were carried out in China. The 77th Separate Rocket Artillery Battalion of the 336th Rocket Artillery Brigade of the Belarusian Ground Forces is equipped with it. An upgraded version called Polonez-M passed all trials and has been accepted into service by the Belarusian Ground Forces as of May 2019. Polonez-M has an increased range of 290 km (186.4 mi), a higher share of domestic components and can fire the improved A-300 missile.

See also 

 Katyusha, BM-13, BM-8, and BM-31 multiple rocket launchers of World War II
 T-122 Sakarya, Turkish 122 mm multiple launch rocket system
 Fajr-5, Iranian 333 mm long-range multiple launch rocket system
 TOROS, Turkish 230 and 260 mm multiple launch rocket system
 BM-14, Soviet 140 mm multiple launch rocket system
 BM-21 Grad, Soviet 122 mm multiple launch rocket system
 BM-27 Uragan, Soviet 220 mm multiple launch rocket system
 M270, U.S. multiple launch rocket system
 Pinaka Multi Barrel Rocket Launcher, Indian 214 mm multiple launch rocket system
 TOS-1 Buratino, Soviet / Russian Heavy Flame Thrower System (multiple rocket / thermobaric weapon launcher)

References

External links 

 Polonez Multiple launch rocket system
 Polonez Multiple Launch Rocket System (MLRS), Belarus

Wheeled self-propelled rocket launchers
Self-propelled artillery of Belarus
Multiple rocket launchers
Modular rocket launchers
Military equipment of Belarus
Military vehicles introduced in the 2010s